Leiostyla heterodon is a species of small air-breathing land snail, a terrestrial pulmonate gastropod mollusk in the family Lauriidae.

Distribution
This species is endemic to Madeira, Portugal, where it inhabits four closely localised sites in the central highlands of the island. It is found on rock ledges and on crags in the summit regions of Pico do Arieiro and Pico Ruivo.

References

 Mollusc Specialist Group 1996.

External links
2006 IUCN Red List of Threatened Species.

	

Endemic fauna of Madeira
Molluscs of Europe
Leiostyla
Taxonomy articles created by Polbot